The 3rd Battalion, 28th Marines (3/28) is an inactive infantry battalion of the United States Marine Corps. They were part of the 28th Marine Regiment and 5th Marine Division and fought during the Battle of Iwo Jima in World War II. They were activated again for the Vietnam War but were deactivated after the war and remain inactive today.

History

Battle of Iwo Jima
They were assigned to land at green beach after D-Day. On D-Day, 1st Battalion, 28th Marines (1/28) and 2nd Battalion, 28th Marines (2/28) would hit green beach. 3rd Battalion, 28th Marines was summoned in the battle earlier than expected. 3rd Battalion, 28th Marines helped fight for Mount Suribachi. On D-Day plus four the mountain was secured by a platoon from 2nd Battalion, 28th Marines. After the capture of Mt. Suribachi the entire 28th Marine Regiment was thrown in the fight for the northern half of the island.

On the night of March 24, 1945, the final organized Japanese combat unit made a final charge at the 28th and 26th Marines. 53 Americans and 262 Japanese were killed in the attack. The island was declared completely secure a few hours later. After the war, 3/28 was deactivated.

Vietnam War
They were re-activated during the Vietnam War and participated in many campaigns in the northern areas of South Vietnam.

Unit awards
Presidential Unit Citation, 19-28 February 1945, Iwo Jima

See also
History of the United States Marine Corps
List of United States Marine Corps battalions

References

Bibliography

Infantry battalions of the United States Marine Corps
Inactive units of the United States Marine Corps